Durham Regatta is a rowing regatta held annually on the second weekend in June on the River Wear in Durham, North East of England; It is known as the Henley of the North, but began several years before the more prestigious Henley Royal Regatta. Durham Regatta is the second-oldest rowing regatta in England, preceded only by Chester Regatta. The first regatta was held over 17–19 June 1834, opening with a six-oared race in 1834 won by Velocity, owned by W. L. Wharton, High Sheriff of Durham, against the Durham University Original Club in Sylph.

The race has been held 182 times and, in recent years, the regatta has had competitors from all corners of the UK, as well as crews from as far afield as Amsterdam. Almost all colleges of Durham University will compete across a variety of boat types and standards, and it is usually the chance to determine which college has the strongest crews of the year.

Events

Events are competed over either the short (regatta) course, a  stretch of river which provides an excellent view of racing from start to finish, or the long (championship) course. The long course of  takes in a number of sweeping bends and Elvet Bridge and ends near Prebends Bridge.

Grand Challenge Cup 

The blue riband event is the Grand Challenge Cup, which has been run since 1854. It has recently been dominated by Durham University Boat Club and Newcastle University Boat Club. This event is for Elite Men's Coxed Fours, and due to the introduction of the Prince Albert Challenge Cup for Men's Student Coxed Fours at Henley Royal Regatta, this event has proved to be useful practice for student crews from the University Boat Club and College Boat Clubs in the run up to the Royal Regatta.

Gallery

See also
Rowing clubs on the River Wear.

References

External links
 Durham Regatta
 BBC News

Sport in Durham, England
Durham University Rowing
University rowing competitions in the United Kingdom
Annual sporting events in the United Kingdom
1834 establishments in England
June sporting events
Recurring events established in 1834
Annual events in England